M. Jayachandran is a film score composer, singer, and musician in Indian films He has won the Kerala State Film Award for Best Music Director for a record number of seven times In 2005, he also won the state award for best male singer. In 2015, he won the National Film Award for Best Music Direction for the film Ennu Ninte Moideen. He has composed music for more than one hundred films.

Filmography

References

Malayalam film score composers
Malayalam playback singers
Malayalam music
Malayalam music albums
National Film Award (India) winners